Laida Lertxundi is a Spanish artist, filmmaker and professor of fine arts based in the United States and The Basque Country, Spain.

Biography 
Born in Bilbao, Spain, in 1981, she moved to study in the United States. She has a Bachelor of Fine Arts from Bard College in New York and an MA from the California Institute of the Arts (CalArts). 

She has taught as a professor of Fine Arts and Humanities at the Art Center College of Design, Otis College of Art and Design and the University of California in San Diego.

Her vocation for cinema began during her studies at Bard College, when she learned about the work of different filmmakers such as Hollis Frampton, Maya Deren and Michael Snow. Her films, mostly shot in 16 mm, are located in natural, urban and domestic spaces in and around Los Angeles, where she has lived for a decade. Included under the generic title "Landscape Plus", they move between the intimate spaces of interiority and the magnitude of the great open Californian landscapes, with the intention of encompassing a geography transformed by affective and subjective states.

Career 
In her cinema, the cinematographic forms of narration are diluted and replaced by the revelation of process and materiality. Through an intense work of relationship between images and diegetic sounds, the synchrony creates a sensation of real time and lived experience, a tension between form and that experience that always surpasses it. In this way, the more formalistic or abstract aspect of her cinema, with a structural vocation, is pierced by an emotional tone, at the same time as it gives rise to false clues about ambiguous fictions. 

Her films have been shown in exhibitions and screenings at MoMA, Museo Nacional Centro de Arte Reina Sofía in Madrid, the Whitney Biennial (2012), Made In L.A. at the Hammer Museum(2016), REDCAT, Los Angeles (2018); Walker Art Center (2017) Tate Modern (2016); ICA, London (2016); Whitechapel Gallery, London (2015), the National Gallery of Art, Washington D.C. (2015); Museo de Arte Moderno, Medellin, Colombia (2015) and MoMA PS1 (2013). 

She has had solo exhibitions at Matadero, Madrid (2019), LUX, London (2018), Tramway, Glasgow (2018), Tabakalera, San Sebastian (2017), fluent, Santander, (2017), DA2, Salamanca (2015), Vdrome (2014), Azkuna Zentroa, Bilbao (2014) and Gallery Marta Cervera (2013). 

Her films have premiered at the New York film Festival, the Rotterdam International Film Festival, the Edinburgh International Film Festival (2014)

Filmography 

 Footnotes to a House of Love (2007)
 My Tears Are Dry (2009)
 Cry When it Happens / Llora Cuando Te Pase (2010)
 A Lax Riddle Unit (2011)
 The Room Called Heaven (2012)
 Utskor: Either/Or (2013)
 We Had the Experience but Missed the Meaning (2014)
 Vivir para Vivir / Live to Live (2015)
 025 Sunset Red (2016)
 Words, Planets (2018)
 Autoficción (2020)

Awards 

 Premio Gure Artea (2020) 
 Jury Award, Ann Arbor Film Festival (2016)

References 

1981 births
Living people
California Institute of the Arts alumni
California Institute of the Arts faculty
Film directors from the Basque Country (autonomous community)
People from Bilbao
Spanish women film directors
University of California, San Diego faculty